The Aero Spacelines Super Guppy is a large, wide-bodied cargo aircraft that is used for hauling outsize cargo components. It was the successor to the Pregnant Guppy, the first of the Guppy aircraft produced by Aero Spacelines. Five were built in two variants, both of which were colloquially referred to as the "Super Guppy".

The Super Guppy is the only airplane to carry a complete S-IVB stage, the third stage of the Saturn V rocket. It did so several times during the Apollo program.

Design and development

The first, the Super Guppy, or "SG", was built directly from the fuselage of a C-97J Turbo Stratocruiser, the military version of the 1950s Boeing 377 Stratocruiser passenger plane.

In addition to the fuselage modifications, the Super Guppy used Pratt & Whitney T-34-P-7WA turboprop engines for increased power and range, and modified wing and tail surfaces.

After a month of tests, Super Guppy suffered fuselage collapse on September 25 when undergoing high speed dives during certification tests. After starting a dive at 10,000 feet the upper fuselage collapsed. The plane had been carrying 30,000 pounds of borate in 100 pound sacks, which were damaged and spilled powder that temporarily blinded the crew. With the help of a DC-9 chase plane, the crew was able to land on the dry bed of Rogers Dry Lake and save the aircraft. After that, Guppy's upper superstructure was redesigned and rebuilt at Edwards Air Force Base.

The second version was officially known as the Super Guppy Turbine (SGT), although it used turboprop engines like the first Super Guppy. This variant used Allison 501-D22C turboprops. Unlike the previous Guppy, the main portion of its fuselage was constructed from scratch. These design improvements, combined with a pressurized crew cabin that allowed for higher-altitude cruising, allowed the SGT to transport more cargo than its predecessors.

The SGT retained only the cockpit, wings, tail, and main landing gear of the 377. The nose gear was taken from a Boeing 707 and rotated 180 degrees.  This dropped the front of the aircraft slightly, leveling the cargo-bay floor and simplifying loading operations.

In the early 1970s, the two Super Guppy Turbines were used by Airbus to transport airplane parts from decentralized production facilities to the final assembly plant in Toulouse. In 1982 and 1983, two additional Super Guppy Turbines were built by Union de Transports Aériens Industries in France after Airbus bought the right to produce the aircraft. The four Super Guppies have since been replaced in this role by the Airbus Beluga, capable of carrying twice as much cargo by weight.

Variants
Aero Spacelines B-377-SG Super Guppy, prototype of a much enlarged version of the Guppy using C-97J components, powered by four Pratt & Whitney T-34-P-7WA turbo-prop engines.
Aero Spacelines B-377-SGT Super Guppy Turbine (Guppy 201), production version powered by Allison 501-D22C turbo-prop engines, using an enlarged cargo section built from scratch instead of being converted from original C-97J components.

Aircraft

One Super Guppy remains in service with NASA. Three are on display, and one was scrapped.

Super Guppy N940NS (previously N1038V), serial number 52–2693, is on display at the Pima Air & Space Museum adjacent to Davis–Monthan Air Force Base in Tucson, Arizona, US.
Super Guppy Turbine F-BTGV (formerly N211AS), serial number 0001, was on static display at the former British Aviation Heritage Centre, Bruntingthorpe Aerodrome, United Kingdom. The aircraft was broken up in December 2020, with the cockpit saved by the South Wales Aviation Museum.
Super Guppy Turbine F-BPPA (formerly N212AS), serial number 0002, is on static display in the Musée Aeronautique Aeroscopia near the Airbus facility, Toulouse–Blagnac Airport, France.
Super Guppy Turbine F-GDSG, serial number 0003, is on static display at the Airbus facility, Hamburg Finkenwerder Airport, Germany.
Super Guppy Turbine N941NA (formerly F-GEAI), serial number 0004, is still in service with NASA as a transport aircraft and is based at the El Paso Forward Operating Location at the El Paso International Airport, in El Paso, Texas, US. It is the last operational Boeing 377 Stratocruiser in the world.

Operators

Current
NASA

Former
Aero Spacelines
Aeromaritime
Airbus

Specifications (Super Guppy Turbine)

See also

References

Bibliography

External links

Super Guppy website by NASA Aircraft Operations
Super Guppy website by NASA Human Spaceflight
Boeing B-377 historical website at Boeing.com
AllAboutGuppys.com
Super Guppy F-BTGV restoration project 

Super Guppy
NASA aircraft
1960s United States cargo aircraft
Four-engined tractor aircraft
Low-wing aircraft
Four-engined turboprop aircraft
Guppy, Super
Aircraft first flown in 1965
Aircraft related to spaceflight